The Odd Couple: Together Again is a 1993 made-for-TV film starring Tony Randall and Jack Klugman as Felix Unger and Oscar Madison, respectively. It is an extension to the original Odd Couple series in which Felix is once again rooming with Oscar, but only temporarily due to his daughter, Edna, getting married.  The film aired on September 24, 1993 on CBS.

Plot
In a ballroom at the Plaza Hotel, the always fussy, neat, and perfectionist Felix Unger is leading the dress rehearsal for his daughter Edna's wedding. The rehearsal has gone on so long that everybody in the wedding is too tired to even stand up straight anymore and the violinist is complaining of how often he has to play Felix's selected song. The rehearsal is cutting into the time the hotel needs to set up for another event in that ballroom. This, along with Felix giving an ultimatum over something he requested in the ballroom that hadn't been fulfilled, gets their reservation revoked by the assistant manager.

Gloria, Felix's wife (whom he remarried at the end of the series), decides to kick him out of the house for two weeks in order for her to plan the wedding without him. Naturally, he returns to the apartment of his former roommate, Oscar Madison. He finds the apartment messy as usual (and with a stored motorcycle in the hallway, for which Oscar is charging the owner half of what storage places in New York would charge), but more importantly, Oscar's voice is now raspy and hoarse after having a vocal cord removed due to throat cancer. (Klugman in real life had throat cancer surgery in 1989.)

Felix is so touched by Oscar's cancer situation, he arranges a poker game, but tells all the old buddies to always let Oscar win. Which goes well until Speed finally cracks and beats him and spills the beans. Oscar forgives them and resumes playing poker with them. Felix helps Oscar with voice exercises, which start to strengthen his vocal cords, enough so that Felix, who is producing television commercials, offers Oscar a voice-over job. However, Oscar isn't too thrilled to find out it would be for the voice of a toilet that had been cleaned with the advertised product. Felix then gets him a job again with the New York Examiner newspaper, but it's as the personal advice columnist, not as a sportswriter. Oscar reluctantly accepts, but starts to enjoy the job once Myrna transfers over to help him. Eventually, he resigns and gives the job to her since she's been basically doing all the work.

Felix holds the engagement dinner at Oscar's apartment when Gloria couldn't do so, due to painters still working. All goes well, including Felix bonding with Edna's fiancée over many things, until he finds out the fiancée has been divorced twice, at which things turn severely sour.

Felix is now on the lam to learn about his previous wives. The first one is a cutthroat photographer who threatens to fire two assistants, and then fires the secretary for letting Oscar and Felix in. This alone causes Edna to come by and ask Oscar to tell Felix to stop, because it's embarrassing. Oscar tries to talk Felix out of it, and Felix initially says he will stop.

However, he goes to find the second wife. As it turned out, she was a nudist whom Felix inadvertently had a photo taken with, that got back to Gloria. Gloria, in turn, kicks him out of the wedding permanently and files an injunction against him. Felix asks Oscar to walk Edna down the aisle in his place and also give a speech, to which Oscar agrees.

However, because he knows it isn't the same, Oscar sets things up to have Felix take his place where he belongs, by stopping and making an impassioned speech about him and what walking his own daughter down the aisle would mean to him. After so, Felix, who was pathetically hiding behind shrubbery (his top hat clearly visible), is brought into the wedding to assume the duty and nobody objects.

After a very lively reception, where Edna intentionally tosses the bouquet to Oscar's girlfriend, Jeannie, before entering the limo, Oscar confesses to Felix that he is willing to accept the toilet bowl voiceover job, but Felix informs him the spot was long since taken, then offers him a spot in a potato chip ad as the voice of the deep fryer, which he accepts.

Reception
Variety said, "The Odd Couple is often mediocre as it wanders through a two-hour slot. But the visit is a walk down memory lane and Klugman’s performance should give others in his shoes inspiration and encouragement."

References

External links
 

 

The Odd Couple
1993 films
1993 television films